Guillaume de Nogaret (1260  13 April 1313) was a French statesman, councillor and keeper of the seal to Philip IV of France.

Early life 
Nogaret was born in Saint-Félix-Lauragais, Haute-Garonne. The family held a small ancestral property of servile origin at Nogaret, near Saint-Félix-de-Caraman (today's Saint-Félix-Lauragais), from which it took its name. In 1291 Guillaume was professor of jurisprudence at the university of Montpellier, and in 1296 he became a member of the Curia Regis at Paris. From 1306, he was a seigneur of Marsillargues, Calvisson, Aujargues and Congénies in Languedoc.

Councillor to Philip IV 
His name is mainly connected with the quarrel between Philip IV and Pope Boniface VIII. In 1300 he was sent with an embassy to Boniface, of which he left a picturesque and highly coloured account. His influence over the king dates from February 1303, when he persuaded Philip to consent to the bold plan of seizing Boniface and bringing him forcibly from Italy to a council in France meant to depose him. On 7 March he received, with three others, a secret commission from the royal chancery to "go to certain places ... and make such treaties with such persons as seemed good to them." On 12 March a solemn royal assembly was held in the Louvre, at which Guillaume de Nogaret read a long series of accusations against Boniface and demanded the calling of a general council to try him.

Attack on the Pope

Soon afterwards he went to Italy. By the aid of a Florentine spy, Nogaret gathered a band of adventurers and of enemies of the Gaetani (Boniface's family) in the Apennines. The great Colonna house, in a bitter feud with the Gaetani, was his strongest ally, and Sciarra Colonna accompanied Nogaret to Anagni, Boniface's birthplace. On 7 September, with their band of some sixteen hundred men, Nogaret and Colonna surprised the little town. The army attacked Boniface at his Palace in Anagni next to the Cathedral. The Pope responded with a bull dated 8 September 1303, in which Philip and Nogaret were excommunicated. Boniface was taken prisoner. Sciarra wished to kill him, but Nogaret's policy was to take him to France and compel him to summon a general council. The French Chancellor and the Colonnas demanded the Pope's resignation; Boniface VIII responded that he would "sooner die". In response, Colonna allegedly slapped Boniface, a "slap" historically remembered as the schiaffo di Anagni ("Anagni slap").

The tide soon turned, however. On the 9th a concerted rising of the townsmen in support of Boniface put Nogaret and his allies to flight, and the pope was free. His death at Rome on 11 October saved Nogaret. The election of the timid Benedict XI was the beginning of the triumph of France that lasted through the Avignon captivity. Early in 1304 Nogaret went to Languedoc to report to Philip IV, and was rewarded by gifts of land and money. Then he was sent back with an embassy to Benedict XI to demand absolution for all concerned in the struggle with Boniface VIII. Benedict refused to meet Nogaret, excepted him from the general absolution he granted on 12 May 1304, and on 7 June issued against him and his associates at Anagni the bull Flagitiosum scelus. Nogaret replied with apologies for his conduct, and when Benedict died on 7 July 1304 Nogaret pointed to his death as a witness to the justice of his cause.

French influence led to a Frenchman, Bertrand de Got (Clement V), being elected as Benedict's successor. The threat of proceedings against the memory of Boniface was renewed to force Clement to absolve Nogaret, and Clement had given way on this point when the further question of an inquiry into the condition of the Knights Templar was brought forward by Philip as a preliminary to their arrest and the seizure of their property in October 1307. Nogaret was active in getting the renegade members of the order to give evidence against their fellows, and the proceedings against them bear traces of his unscrupulous and merciless pen. Clement's weak and ineffective resistance to this still further delayed the agreement between him and Philip. Nogaret had become keeper of the seal that year in succession to Pierre de Belleperche.

His talents as an advocatus diaboli were given still further employment in the trial of Guichard, bishop of Troyes, charged with various crimes, including witchcraft and unchastity. The trial, which began in 1308 and lasted until 1313, was a hint to Clement as to what might happen if the oft-repeated threat of a trial of Boniface were carried out. Absolution was obtained from Clement on 27 April 1311. Guillaume de Nogaret was to go on the next crusade and visit certain places of pilgrimage in France and Spain as a penance, but never did so. He died in 1313 with his tongue horribly thrust out, according to the chronicler Jean Desnouelles. He retained the seals until his death and was occupied with the king's affairs concerning Flanders as late as the end of March 1313.

Literature
Nogaret is a major character in Les Rois maudits (The Accursed Kings), a series of historical novels by Maurice Druon, which were adapted into a television miniseries in 1972 and again in 2005.

Sources 
 
 Elizabeth A. R. Brown, "Philip the Fair and His Ministers: Guillaume de Nogaret and Enguerran de Marigny", in The Capetian Century, 1214–1314, ed. by William Chester Jordan, Jenna Rebecca Phillips, Turnhout, Brepols, 2017, pp. 185–218.
  Elizabeth A. R. Brown, "Veritas à la cour de Philippe le Bel de France: Pierre Dubois, Guillaume de Nogaret et Marguerite Porete', in La vérité. Vérité et crédibilité: construire la vérité dans le système de communication de l'Occident (XIIIe-XVIIe siècle), ed. by J.-P. Genet, Paris, Publications de la Sorbonne, 2016, pp. 425–445, online.
 Elizabeth A. R. Brown, « The Faith of Guillaume de Nogaret, His Excommunication, and the Fall of the Knights Templar », dans Cristo e il potere. Teologia, antropologia e politica, dir. Laura Andreani, Agostino Paravicini Bagliani, Florence, Sismel-Edizioni del Galluzzo, 2017, pp. 157–181.
  Robert Holtzmann, Wilhelm von Nogaret. Rat und Grosssiegelbewahrer Philipps des Schönen von Frankreich, Freiburg-im-Breisgau, 189, Online.
  Sébastien Nadiras, Guillaume de Nogaret et la pratique du pouvoir, thesis of the École des chartes, 2003.
 Franklin J. Pegues, The Lawyers of the Last Capetians, Princeton, 1962.
 Ernest Renan, Guillaume de Nogaret, dans Histoire littéraire de la France, t. XXVII, .
  Bernard Moreau, dir., Guillaume de Nogaret, un languedocien au service de la monarchie capétienne. Actes du colloque de Nîmes, 20 janvier 2012, Nîmes, Lucie Éditions, 2012 .
  Bernard Moreau, Julien Théry-Astruc, ed., La royauté capétienne et le Midi au temps de Guillaume de Nogaret. Actes du colloque des 29 et 30 novembre 2013, Nîmes, Éditions de la Fenestrelle, 2015 .
Julien Théry, "Philip the Fair, the Trial of the 'Perfidious Templars' and the Pontificalization of the French Monarchy", in Journal of Medieval Religious Culture, 39/2 (2013), pp. 117–148, online
 J.Théry-Astruc, "The Pioneer of Royal Theocracy. Guillaume de Nogaret and the conflicts between Philip the Fair and the Papacy", in The Capetian Century, 1214–1314, ed. by William Chester Jordan, Jenna Rebecca Phillips, Turnhout, Brepols, 2017, pp. 219–259.
  J.Théry-Astruc, « Negocium Christi. Guillaume de Nogaret et le christocentrisme capétien, de l'affaire Boniface VIII à l'affaire du Temple », dans Cristo e il potere. Teologia, antropologia e politica, dir. Laura Andreani, Agostino Paravicini Bagliani, Florence, Sismel-Edizioni del Galluzzo, 2017, pp. 183–209, online.
 For the sources consult Martin Bouquet, Recueil des historiens des Gaules et de la France, vols xx.-xxiii.; Annales regis Edwardi primi in Rishanger (Rolls series), pp. 483–491, which gives the fullest account of the affair at Anagni.

References

External links 
 http://congenies.canalblog.com; specially for the "Nogaret bell" of the church.

1260 births
1313 deaths
13th-century French jurists
14th-century French jurists
People temporarily excommunicated by the Catholic Church
People from Haute-Garonne
Philip IV of France